Anthony D'Amato (born November 27, 1987), is an American songwriter and singer. His latest album is 2022's At First There Was Nothing.

Biography 
D'Amato grew up in Blairstown, New Jersey, and attended Blair Academy on a scholarship. He attended Princeton University, where he recorded his first album, Down Wires, in a dormitory during his senior year, graduating in 2010. He released the record independently in 2010, catching the attention of NPR, which called his song "My Father's Son" a "modern folk gem," and the World Cafe, which featured him in their emerging artist series "Next." D'Amato followed it up with another home recording, Paper Back Bones, which made BBC Scotland's Best Americana Albums of 2012, and was described by host Ricky Ross as "one of [our] favourites of all time."

In 2014, D'Amato released his New West Records debut, The Shipwreck From The Shore, which was inspired in part by his time studying with the Pulitzer Prize-winning Irish poet Paul Muldoon and earned widespread critical acclaim, with NPR noting that "he writes in the tradition of Bruce Springsteen or Josh Ritter" and USA Today saying it "strikes every right note." The album was recorded with producer Sam Kassirer (Josh Ritter, Langhorne Slim) at The Great North Sound Society in Maine with members of Bon Iver and Megafaun. Songs from the record racked up million plays on Spotify and turned up on the ABC series Nashville, while the album earned additional praise everywhere from The New York Times and The Wall Street Journal to New York magazine and Billboard.

D'Amato returned in 2016 with Cold Snap, recorded in Omaha, NE, with producer Mike Mogis (Bright Eyes, First Aid Kit) and featuring performances by Conor Oberst and members of Bright Eyes, The Faint, and Cursive. RollingStone.com named him an "Artist You Need To Know", and D'Amato made his national TV debut on CBS This Morning.

D'Amato's latest album, 2022's At First There Was Nothing, marked his debut release for the Blue Rose label and earned similar acclaim, with American Songwriter calling it "a new masterpiece" and MOJO awarding it four stars.

D'Amato is also a member of the folk rock supergroup Fantastic Cat, which released its first album, The Very Best Of Fantastic Cat, and made its national TV debut in 2022.

Solo Discography 
 Down Wires (2010)
 Paper Back Bones (2012)
 The Shipwreck From The Shore (2014)
 Cold Snap (2016)
 At First There Was Nothing (2022)

Fantastic Cat Discography 
 The Very Best Of Fantastic Cat (2022)

References

External links 
 

Living people
1987 births
American folk rock musicians
American male singer-songwriters
Blair Academy alumni
New West Records artists
People from Blairstown, New Jersey
Singer-songwriters from New Jersey
21st-century American singers
21st-century American male singers